Noor Saleem Rana is an Indian politician and member of the Sixteenth Legislative Assembly of Uttar Pradesh. Rana represented the Charthawal constituency of Uttar Pradesh and is a member of the Rashtriya Lok Dal political party.

Early life and education
Noor Saleem Rana was born in Village Sujroo, Muzaffarnagar district, Uttar Pradesh, India on 14 July 1973. His highest attained education is intermediate. Prior to joining politics, he was an agriculturist by profession.

Political career
Noor Saleem Rana has been a MLA for one term. He represented Charthawal Assembly constituency over the symbol of Bahujan Samaj Party. Since 2021, He is associated with Rashtriya Lok Dal.

Controversies 
On 17 January 2017, Rana was booked for violating the electoral code of conduct by setting up political posters in Charthawal without permission.

Posts held

See also 
Bahujan Samaj Party
Politics of India
Charthawal (Assembly constituency)
Sixteenth Legislative Assembly of Uttar Pradesh
Uttar Pradesh Legislative Assembly

References

Bahujan Samaj Party politicians from Uttar Pradesh
People from Muzaffarnagar district
1973 births
Living people
Uttar Pradesh MLAs 2012–2017
Uttar Pradesh politicians